Pavel Anatolyevich Yushkov (born 14 February 1979) is a former Russian professional footballer.

Club career
He played two seasons in the Russian Football National League for FC Kristall Smolensk and FC Avangard Kursk.

External links
 

1979 births
People from Vyazma
Living people
Russian footballers
Russian expatriate footballers
Expatriate footballers in Armenia
FC Mika players
Armenian Premier League players
FC Kristall Smolensk players
Association football forwards
FC Avangard Kursk players
FC Dynamo Bryansk players
Sportspeople from Smolensk Oblast